International School of Carthage (ISC; , EIC) is a private school in Carthage, Tunisia that provides elementary and secondary education.

References

External links 
 Official website

See also 
 List of schools in Tunisia
 Lycée Pierre Mendès France
 American Cooperative School of Tunis
 Sadiki College

French international schools in Tunisia
Education in Tunis